Dwight Heald Perkins (March 26, 1867 – November 2, 1941) was an American architect and planner.

Perkins was born in Memphis, Tennessee, and  moved to Chicago with his family at age four. His mother was widowed a few years after his family completed their move. His father died when Dwight was young.

Perkins attended only three months of high school, having to find work to help support his family. He worked initially at the Chicago Stockyards and later at the architectural firms Wheelock & Clay and for a few months for Frederick Schock. He was accepted to study architecture at the Massachusetts Institute of Technology in 1885. A family friend, Mrs. Charles Hitchcock, helped finance his education there.

He studied at MIT for two years and was so skilled that he was invited to serve as an instructor for a third year. Also while in Boston, he met Lucy Fitch, who would become his wife on August 18, 1891.

Perkins left Boston in late 1888.  In January 1889 he interviewed at Burnham & Root in Chicago and was employed in early February of that year.  He remained for 5 years, gradually assuming more and more responsibility. He left at the end of 1893 to form his own firm. It was during this period that Perkins was associated with a group called "The Eighteen" that included like-minded architects such as Lawrence Buck and Frank Lloyd Wright.

On January 1, 1894, he opened the office after receiving his first major commission, with help from Daniel Burnham, the Stevens Point, Wisconsin Normal School.  In 1894 he was commissioned to design a new building for the Steinway Piano company. This building, Steinway Hall, bore little resemblance to the work he would do later, often in the style which became known as "Prairie School" of architecture.

Perkins was offered the commission for Charles Hitchcock Hall as a result of his connection with the donor for the building, Mrs. Charles Hitchcock, who had previously helped fund his college education.

Perkins was appointed the Chief Architect for the Chicago Board of Education by Mayor Edward F. Dunne in 1905.  He was responsible for the design of 40 public schools.  Among these structures was Carl Schurz High School which was described by the American Institute of Architects as "the best and most important" of his designs, in addition to being his "masterpiece" and an "important example of early twentieth century architecture, utilizing elements of both the Chicago and Prairie Schools of Architecture."

His five-year service in this role ended when he was accused of incompetence, inefficiency, and insubordination and was dismissed following a trial in which only the insubordination charge was upheld. However, it is generally accepted that the true reason for his firing was that he refused to bow down to the demands of the corrupt members of the Board of Education who insisted that he give contracts to their cronies.

Perkins had maintained a private practice with John L. Hamilton in addition to his service on the board. In 1911, with the addition of William K. Fellows, the firm of Perkins, Fellows, & Hamilton opened with offices in Chicago's loop. Perkins left the firm  1929 and joined what became Perkins, Chatten, and Hammond, which he left in 1933.

Perkins died in Lordsburg, New Mexico, in 1941 of a cerebral hemorrhage while traveling to his winter home in Pasadena, California.

Other works by Dwight Perkins firm include the Lincoln Park Zoo Lion House, the Alfred Nobel School, and many residential homes.

Forest Preservation
Dwight Perkins was influential in establishing the Cook County Forest Preserve system. As Chicago and the metropolitan region grew quickly in the late 19th century, free spaces and opportunities for recreation and leisure were often forgotten in the rush to industrialize. Progressive Era reformers around the turn of the 20th century pushed for access to natural spaces, and city planners and architects often took part. Perkins was an icon of the Prairie School, which was a branch of the Arts and Crafts movement, a radical artistic movement to value handicraft, and to make art and beauty accessible to people of all social classes. Perkins's work is an example of this: excellent artistic architectural design in everyday city communities. The parks movement was another way to make sure natural beauty was accessible to Chicagoans. Dwight Perkins's son, Lawrence Perkins, who followed in his father's footsteps as another great Chicago architect, once said this of his father's oeuvre: "His real monument in his own eyes was the forest preserve system."
Perkins co-wrote the 1905 Metropolitan Parks Report that ignited the forest preserve campaign. His plans were far-reaching, including boulevards, parks, beaches, and forests throughout the city and suburban Cook county. Many of these ideas were incorporated into the 1909 Daniel Burnham Plan of Chicago, and many have taken decades to come to fruition. Perkins worked closely with landscape architect Jens Jensen. The two argued for the urgency of the issue by connecting the need for parks with Chicago's atrocious living conditions, believing leisure time had a direct correlation with rates of death, disease, and crime.

Selected works
In a statistical overview derived from writings by and about Dwight Perkins, the architect,  OCLC/WorldCat encompasses roughly 10+ works in 20 publications in 2 languages and 100+ library holdings .  

 A Metropolitan Park System for Chicago (1904)
 Educational Buildings (1925)

Buildings

Carl Schurz High School
Lane Technical College Prep High School
George W. Tilton Elementary School
Grover Cleveland Elementary School
Lincoln Park Zoo, Cafe Brauer
Lincoln Park Zoo Lion House
Lyman Trumbull Elementary School
Bowen High School (Chicago)
Charles Hitchcock Hall (Chicago)
First Bank Building (South Bend, Indiana)
Mishawaka High School (Mishawaka, Indiana)

Notes

References 
 Cohen, Stuart and Susan Bejamin. (2004).  North Shore Chicago; Houses of the Lakefront Suburbs 1890-1940. New York: Acanthus Press. ;  OCLC 237065244
 "Dwight Heald Perkins," Dictionary of American Biography, Supplement 3: 1941-1945. American Council of Learned Societies, 1973.
 Hasbrouck, Wilbert R. (2005). The Chicago Architectural Club: Prelude to the Modern. New York: Monacelli Press. ;  OCLC 470167804

External links
Dwight Perkins at the Prairie Styles Web site

1867 births
1941 deaths
19th-century American architects
20th-century American architects
People from Memphis, Tennessee
Architects from Tennessee